This list includes notable boarding schools (where some or all pupils study and live during the school year).

Africa

Cameroon
Our Lady of Lourdes College, Mankon
Saker Baptist College, Limbe

Ghana

Aburi Girls' Senior High School
Accra Academy
Accra Girls Senior High School
Achimota School
Adisadel College
Aggrey Memorial A.M.E. Zion Senior High School
Anglican Senior High School, Kumasi
Archbishop Potter Girls' School 
Ghana National College
Holy Child School 
Koforidua Senior High Technical School
Kumasi Academy
Kumasi High School
Mfantsiman Girls' Secondary School
Mfantsipim School
Ofori Panin Senior High School
Opoku Ware School
Pope John Senior High School and Minor Seminary
Prempeh College
Presbyterian Boys' Secondary School
St. Augustine's College
St. Monica's School
St. Louis Secondary School
St. Roses Girls Secondary School 
Wesley Girls' High School

Kenya
Brookhouse International School
Nairobi Academy
Rift Valley Academy
Saint Andrews School

Malawi
Kamuzu Academy
Saint Andrews International High School

Namibia
Deutsche Höhere Privatschule Windhoek

Nigeria
Apata Memorial High School
Bristol Academy, Abuja
Faith Academy Secondary School
Federal Government Girls' College, Owerri
Landmark University Secondary School
Loyola Jesuit College
Mea Mater Elizabeth High School
Olashore International School

South Africa
Afrikaanse Hoër Meisieskool
Afrikaanse Hoër Seunskool
African Leadership Academy
Cornwall Hill College
Dale College Boys' High School, King Williams Town
Diocesan College
Diocesan School for Girls, Grahamstown
Durban Girls' College
Durban High School
Glenwood High School
Graeme College, Grahamstown
Grey College, Bloemfontein
Grey High School
Heritage Academy, Pietermaritzburg
Herschel Girls' School
Hilton College
Jeppe High School for Boys
Kearsney College
King Edward VII School, Johannesburg
Kingswood College, Grahamstown
Maritzburg College
Michaelhouse
Northwood School
Oprah Winfrey Leadership Academy for Girls
Paarl Boys' High School
Parktown Boys' High School
Paul Roos Gymnasium
Penryn College
Pinelands High School
Pretoria Boys High School
Pretoria High School for Girls
Queen's College, Queenstown, Eastern Cape
Rhenish Girls' High School
Roedean School
Rondebosch Boys' High School
Rustenburg School for Girls
South African College Schools
St. Alban's College
St. Andrew's College, Grahamstown
St. Anne's Diocesan College
St Benedict's
St. Charles College, Pietermaritzburg
St. John's College, Johannesburg
St. Mary's Diocesan School for Girls, Kloof
St Stithians College
Selborne College
Stanford Lake College
Stirling High School, East London
Treverton Preparatory School and College, Mooi River
Victoria Girls' High School, Grahamstown 
The Wykeham Collegiate
Wynberg Boys' High School
Wynberg Girls' High School

Swaziland
Waterford Kamhlaba

Tanzania
Isamilo International School Mwanza
United World College East Africa

Uganda
Kings College Budo
Mbarara High School
Rainbow International School
Taibah College School

Zambia
Banani International Secondary School
Baobab College
Canisius Secondary School
Ibenga Girls
Musikili Primary School

Zimbabwe
Bernard Mizeki College
Chaplin High School
Chinhoyi High School
Chisipite Senior School
Christian Brothers College, Bulawayo
Churchill School
Cornway College
Eaglesvale High School
Ellis Robins School
Falcon College
Fletcher High School
Girls' College
Gokomere High School
Goldridge College
Goromonzi High School
Hillcrest College
Inyathi High School
Jameson High School
Kutama College
Kwenda Mission
Kyle College
Lingfield Christian Academy
Lomagundi College
Marist Brothers Secondary School, Dete
Mazowe Boys High School
Midlands Christian College
Moleli High School
Monte Cassino Girls High School
Mzingwane High School
Peterhouse Boys' School
Peterhouse Girls' School
Plumtree High School
Prince Edward School
Regina Mundi High School
Rufaro High School
Saint Alberts High School
St Dominic's Chishawasha
St. Faith's School, Rusape
St. Francis Xavier Kutama College
St George's College
St Ignatius College
Watershed College

Asia

Armenia
United World College Dilijan
Monte Melkonian Military College

Bangladesh
Barisal Cadet College
Cadet colleges in Bangladesh
Comilla Cadet College
Faujdarhat Cadet College
Feni Girls Cadet College
Jhenaidah Cadet College
Joypurhat Girls Cadet College
Mirzapur Cadet College
Mymensingh Girls Cadet College
Pabna Cadet College
Rajshahi Cadet College
Rangpur Cadet College
Sylhet Cadet College

Brunei Darussalam
Jerudong International School

China
Chefoo School
English School attached to Guangdong University of Foreign Studies
Guangdong Country Garden School
Shanghai Pinghe School

Hong Kong
Buddhist Fat Ho Memorial College
Diocesan Boys' School
Harrow International School Hong Kong
Hong Kong Adventist Academy
Jockey Club Ti-I College
Li Po Chun United World College
Pui Kiu Middle School
St. Paul's Co-educational College
St. Stephen's College
United Christian College (Kowloon East)

India

Japan
UWC ISAK Japan
NUCB International College

Kazakhstan 

 Cadet Corps of the Defence Ministry
 Zhas Ulan Republican Schools
 Astana Zhas Ulan Republican School
 Almaty Zhas Ulan Republican School
 Karaganda Zhas Ulan Republican School

Korea
Most international, foreign language high schools and self-regulated schools in Korea are boarding schools. Below are examples.
Branksome Hall Asia, Seogwipo, Jejudo
Bugil Academy, Cheonan, South Chungcheong Province
Gyeonggi Suwon International School, Suwon, Gyeonggi Province
Hankuk Academy of Foreign Studies, Yongin, Gyeonggi Province
KIS (Korea International School) Jeju, Seogwipo, Jejudo
Korean Minjok Leadership Academy, Hoengseong, Gangwon Province
 Taejon Christian International School, Daejeon Metropolitan City

Malaysia
Alam Shah Science School
Kolej Islam Sultan Alam Shah
Kolej Tunku Kurshiah
Malay College Kuala Kangsar
MARA Junior Science College
Royal Military College
Sekolah Alam Shah
Sekolah Berasrama Penuh Integrasi Gombak
Sekolah Berasrama Penuh Integrasi Jempol
Sekolah Berasrama Penuh Integrasi Rawang
Sekolah Berasrama Penuh Integrasi Sabak Bernam
Sekolah Berasrama Penuh Integrasi Selandar
Sekolah Datuk Abdul Razak
Sekolah Menengah Agama Persekutuan Kajang
Sekolah Menengah Agama Persekutuan Labu
Sekolah Menengah Sains Hulu Selangor
Sekolah Menengah Sains Johor
Sekolah Menengah Sains Kota Tinggi
Sekolah Menengah Sains Kuala Selangor
Sekolah Menengah Sains Muar
Sekolah Menengah Sains Muzaffar Shah
Sekolah Menengah Sains Raja Tun Azlan Shah
Sekolah Menengah Sains Sabah
Sekolah Menengah Sains Selangor
Sekolah Menengah Sains Seri Puteri
Sekolah Menengah Sains Teluk Intan
Sekolah Menengah Sains Tengku Muhammad Faris Petra
Sekolah Menengah Sains Tuanku Jaafar
Sekolah Menengah Sains Tuanku Munawir
Sekolah Menengah Sains Tuanku Syed Putra
Sekolah Menengah Sultan Abdul Halim
Sekolah Tuanku Abdul Rahman

International schools:
Dalat International School
Kolej Tuanku Ja'afar
Kolej Yayasan Saad
Marlborough College Malaysia
Uplands International School of Penang

Nepal
Basu Higher Secondary School, Bhaktapur
Birendra Sainik Awasiya Mahavidyalaya, Bhaktapur
Budhanilkantha School, Kathmandu
Chelsea International Academy
Durbar High School, Kathmandu
Emerald Academy, Jhapa
Gandaki Boarding School, Pokhara
Green Hills Academy, Kavresthali, Kathmandu
Gyanodaya Bal Batika School, Kathmandu
Janajyoti Vidyamandir, Ghorahi, Dang
Kantipur English High School, Kathmandu
Kathmandu University High School, Kathmandu
Lincoln School, Kathmandu
Modern Nepal Academy, Kathmandu
Mount Everest Boarding School, Pokhara
Nepal Police School
Siddhartha Vanasthali School, Kathmandu
Yashodhara Secondary School, Bhojpur, Nepal

Pakistan
Abbottabad Public School, Abbottabad
Aitchison College, Lahore
Army Burn Hall College, Abbottabad

Cadet College Fateh Jang
Cadet College Hasan Abdal
Cadet College Kohat
Cadet College Petaro
Cadet College Rawalpindi
Cadet College Razmak
Cadet College Skardu
Chand Bagh School, Muridke
Divisional Public School Faisalabad
Government College University, Lahore
Lawrence College, Murree
Mansehra International Public School and College
Military College Jhelum
Military College Murree
Military College Sui
PAF Public School Sargodha
Pakistan Scouts Cadet College Batrasi
Sadiq Public School, Bahawalpur
WAPDA Cadet College Tarbela
White Rose School System

Philippines
Adventist University of the Philippines, Cavite
Brent International School, Baguio
St. Paul American School - Clark, Clark Freeport Zone

Singapore

Anglo-Chinese School
Dunman High School
Hwa Chong Institution Boarding School
Nanyang Girls High School
NUS High School of Math and Science
Raffles Institution
St. Andrew's Junior College
St. Joseph's Institution
Singapore Sports School
United World College of South East Asia
Waseda Shibuya Senior High School in Singapore (formerly Shibuya Makuhari Singapore School)

Tajikistan
Dushanbe International School

Thailand
American Pacific International School, Chiang Mai
Assumption College Sriracha
British International School, Phuket
Bromsgrove International School Thailand
Chiang Rai International School
Harrow International School, Bangkok
Mahidol Wittayanusorn School
Mater Dei School
Prem Tinsulanonda International School
The Regent's School
Vajiravudh College
Wattana Wittaya Academy

Middle East

Bahrain
Bahrain School

Iran
Tehran Japanese School

Jordan
King's Academy

Qatar
King's College, Doha

United Arab Emirates
Repton School Dubai
Swiss International School Dubai

Oceania

Australia

New Zealand

North Island
Auckland Grammar School (for boys), Auckland
Auckland International College, Auckland
Carncot Independent School for Girls, Palmerston North
Dilworth School, Auckland
Diocesan School for Girls, Auckland
Epsom Girls' Grammar School, Auckland
Feilding High School, Manawatu
Hamilton Boys' High School, Hamilton
Hamilton Girls' High School, Hamilton
Hato Paora College, Feilding
Hato Petera College, Auckland
Hereworth School, Havelock North
Hukarere Girls College, Napier
Iona College, Havelock North
King's College, Auckland
Lindisfarne College, New Zealand, Hastings
Longburn Adventist College, Manawatu
Mount Albert Grammar School, Auckland
Napier Boys' High School, Napier
Napier Girls' High School, Napier
New Plymouth Boys' High School, Taranaki
Nga Tawa Diocesan School, Marton
Palmerston North Boys' High School, Palmerston North
Rathkeale College, Masterton
Sacred Heart College, Auckland
St Cuthberts College, Auckland
St Kentigern College, Auckland
St. Patrick's College, Silverstream, Upper Hutt
St Paul's Collegiate School, Hamilton
St Peter's School, Cambridge
Scots College, Wellington
Taranaki Diocesan School for Girls, Stratford
Taumarunui High School, Taumarunui
Te Aute College, Hawke's Bay
Wairarapa College, Masterton
Wanganui Collegiate School, Wanganui
Wesley College, Auckland
Whangarei Boys' High School, Whangarei
Whangarei Girls' High School, Whangarei

South Island
Christchurch Boys' High School, Christchurch
Christchurch Girls' High School, Christchurch
Christ's College, Christchurch
Columba College, Dunedin
Dunstan High School, Alexandra
Garin College, Nelson
Gore High School, Gore
John McGlashan College, Dunedin
Medbury School, Christchurch
Mount Aspiring College, Wanaka
Nelson College, Nelson
Nelson College for Girls, Nelson
Otago Boys' High School, Dunedin
Rangi Ruru Girls' School, Christchurch
St Andrew's College, Christchurch
St Bede's College, Christchurch
St Hilda's Collegiate School, Dunedin
St Kevin's College, Oamaru
St Margaret's College, Christchurch
St Peter's College, Gore
Southland Boys' High School, Invercargill
Southland Girls' High School, Invercargill
Timaru Boys' High School, Timaru
Timaru Girls' High School, Timaru
Waitaki Boys' High School, Oamaru
Waitaki Girls' High School, Oamaru

Europe

Austria
American International School, Salzburg
Höhere Internatsschule des Bundes Wien , Vienna
St. Gilgen International School, St. Gilgen
Theresianum, Vienna

Bosnia and Herzegovina
United World College in Mostar

Czech Republic
Carlsbad International School, Karlovy Vary
Townshend International School, Hluboká nad Vltavou

Denmark
Birkerød Gymnasium , Birkerød
Grenaa Gymnasium, Grenaa
Herlufsholm School, Næstved
Nyborg Gymnasium , Nyborg
Sorø Academy, Sorø

France
Chavagnes International College
École des Roches , Normandy
École Saint Martin de France , Pontoise
Lycée Konan (closed)
Lycée Lakanal
Lycée privé Sainte-Geneviève 
Lycée Seijo (closed)
Maison d'éducation de la Légion d'honneur
Notre-Dame International High School
Sainte Croix des Neiges

Germany
Aloisiuskolleg
Berlin Brandenburg International School
Black Forest Academy
CJD Christophorusschule Königswinter
Collegium Augustinianum Gaesdonck 
Ettal Abbey
Heimschule Kloster Wald 
Landheim Schondorf
Pforta
Robert Bosch United World College
St. George's School, Cologne
Schloss Torgelow (Internats-Gymnasium)
Schule Birklehof
Schule Schloss Salem
Schule Schloss Stein 
Schulpforta
Stiftung Louisenlund

Ireland
Alexandra College, Dublin
Bandon Grammar School, Cork
Blackrock College, Dublin
Cistercian College, Roscrea, County Tipperary
Clongowes Wood College, County Kildare
Dundalk Grammar School, County Louth
Glenstal Abbey School, County Limerick
Gormanston College, County Meath
Kilkenny College, County Kilkenny
The King's Hospital, Dublin
Midleton College, County Cork
Newtown School, Waterford
Rockwell College, County Tipperary
Saint Columba's College, Dublin
Sligo Grammar School, County Sligo
Sutton Park School, Dublin
Villiers Secondary School, Limerick
Wesley College, Dublin
Wilson's Hospital School, Multyfarnham, County Westmeath

Italy
St. Stephen's School Rome
United World College of the Adriatic

Netherlands
United World College Maastricht

Norway
Kvitsund Gymnas, Telemark
Red Cross Nordic United World College, Flekke, Fjaler
Vestborg Vidaregående Skole

Portugal
Colégio Militar
Instituto de Odivelas
Instituto dos Pupilos do Exército

Romania
Costache Negruzzi National College, Iași

Sweden
Sigtunaskolan Humanistiska Läroverket
Lundsbergs skola

Switzerland
College Alpin International Beau Soleil

American School in Switzerland (TASIS), Lugano
Brillantmont International School, Lausanne
Aiglon College
Collège du Léman
Ecole d'Humanité, Bern
Institut Alpin Videmanette
Institut auf dem Rosenberg
Institut Florimont, Geneva
Institut Montana
Institut Monte Rosa
Institut Le Rosey
Leysin American School
Lyceum Alpinum Zuoz
St George's School in Switzerland
Surval Montreux

Turkey
American Collegiate Institute
Darüşşafaka
Galatasaray High School
Istanbul High School
Kabataş Erkek Lisesi
Kadıköy Anadolu Lisesi
Robert College

United Kingdom

North America

Canada

Alberta
Alberta School for the Deaf, Edmonton
Saint John's School of Alberta, Stony Plain

British Columbia
Bodwell High School, North Vancouver
Brentwood College, Mill Bay
Island Oak High School, Vancouver Island
Maxwell International School, Shawnigan Lake (closed in 2000)
Pearson College UWC, Victoria
Queen Margaret's School, Duncan
St. George's School, Vancouver
St. Margaret's School, Victoria
St. Michaels University School, Victoria
Shawnigan Lake School, Shawnigan Lake

Manitoba
Balmoral Hall School, Winnipeg
Mennonite Collegiate Institute, Gretna
St. John's-Ravenscourt School, Winnipeg

New Brunswick
Rothesay Netherwood School, Rothesay

Nova Scotia
King's-Edgehill School, Windsor
Kingston Bible College Academy, Kingston
Landmark East School, Wolfville

Ontario
Albert College, Belleville
Appleby College, Oakville
Ashbury College, Ottawa
Bishop Strachan School, Toronto
Branksome Hall, Toronto
Columbia International College, Hamilton
The Giles School, Toronto
Havergal College, Toronto
Lakefield College School, near Lakefield
Pickering College, Newmarket
Ridley College, St. Catharines
Robert Land Academy, Wellandport
Rosseau Lake College, Rosseau
St. Andrew's College, Aurora
Trafalgar Castle School, Whitby
Trinity College School, Port Hope
Upper Canada College, Toronto

Quebec
Bishop's College School, Lennoxville
Collège Bourget, Rigaud
Sedbergh School, Quebec, Montebello
Stanstead College, Stanstead

Saskatchewan
Athol Murray College of Notre Dame, Wilcox
Caronport High School, Caronport
Luther College, Regina
Rosthern Junior College, Rosthern
Western Christian College, Regina

United States

Central America

Costa Rica
Costa Rica Country Day School (Guanacaste Province)
United World College of Costa Rica

South America

Argentina
St. George's College, Buenos Aires

Brazil
Escola Sesc de Ensino Médio

References